Vinícius Teodoro Barreta Melo (born 16 April 1999), known as Vinícius Barreta or just Vinícius, is a Brazilian footballer who plays as a goalkeeper for Cuiabá.

Career 
Born in Lages, Vinícius started his career in Criciúma in 2017. That year he made four games. In 2018 he made only two games.

Vinícius played one match for Criciúma in 2019, and in April of that year, he was announced by Cruzeiro.

References

External links 
 

1999 births
Living people
Brazilian footballers
Criciúma Esporte Clube players
Cruzeiro Esporte Clube players
Cuiabá Esporte Clube players
Association football goalkeepers